Jawad Hason Williams (born February 19, 1983) is a former American professional basketball player. At 2.06 m (6 ft 9 in), he plays as a small forward-power forward. He played high school basketball at St. Edward High School of Lakewood, Ohio (suburban Cleveland) and college basketball for the University of North Carolina Tar Heels.

High school career 
While at St. Edward, Williams played limited time as a freshman on a team anchored by Sam Clancy, Jr. and Steve Logan that went on to win the OHSAA state title. During his later years in high school, he was named first team All-Ohio and named to numerous All-American teams.  He was named AP and Gatorade Player of the Year for Ohio and played in the McDonald's All-American Game.

Collegiate career 
Williams played collegiate basketball under coaches Matt Doherty and Roy Williams at the University of North Carolina. He started as a senior for the Tar Heel team that won the 2005 NCAA tournament. Williams averaged 13.1 points, 4.0 rebounds, and 1.4 assists in his senior season. He graduated from UNC in 2005 with a B.A. in African-American studies.

Professional career 

Williams was not selected in the 2005 NBA draft. However, he was signed as a free agent by the Los Angeles Clippers of the NBA during the 2006–07 season. He appeared in four preseason games for the Clippers, starting one, but did not make the final roster.

After playing in Spain, Japan and Israel, Williams joined the Cleveland Cavaliers' summer league team in July, 2008 and made the team's training camp roster.  On October 23, the Cavs waived veteran guard Ronald Dupree, and Williams became a full-fledged member of an NBA team for the first time in his career.  His contract was nonguaranteed until January 10, 2009, after which time the contract would have been guaranteed.

Williams played in his first regular season NBA game and scored his first points on December 12, 2008, against the Philadelphia 76ers.  Williams became the sixth member of North Carolina's 2005 National Championship team to play in the NBA, joining Rashad McCants, Sean May, Raymond Felton, Marvin Williams, and David Noel.

Williams was waived by the Cavs on January 7, 2009. Five days after being released from the Cavs he re-signed with the team with a 10-day contract. He was released on February 2 after his second 10-day contract expired. He then joined the D-League with Rio Grande Valley Vipers on February 14. On April 8, he was re-signed to a contract for the rest of the season.

On February 9, 2010, Williams put up a career high in points with 17 to go along with 3  rebounds, 2 assists, and 1 steal in 28 minutes of play.

In the 2010 offseason, Jawad signed to play with the Cavs for the 2010–11 NBA season. On December 27, 2010, Williams was again waived by the Cavs.

In February 2011, he signed with Hapoel Jerusalem in Israel. For the 2011–12 season, Williams signed with Paris-Levallois Basket in France, rejoining college teammate David Noel.  Williams stayed with Paris-Levallois for the 2012–13 season, but while Noel left Williams was joined by former college teammate Sean May. Paris-Levallois waived him on January 15, 2014. In February 2014, he signed with Pınar Karşıyaka of Turkey for the rest of the 2013–14 season.

On June 13, 2016, Williams signed with AEK Athens in Greece for the 2016–17 season. On February 12, 2017, he parted ways with AEK. The next day, he signed with Italian club Pallacanestro Reggiana for the rest of the season.

In July 2017, Williams signed with Alvark Tokyo of the Japanese B.League.

On June 1, 2022, he has announced his retirement from professional basketball.

Williams is now coaching in Japan for Nagasaki Velca. He serves as their first Assistant Coach and Director of Player Development.

Coaching Career 
July 2022, joined Nagasaki Velca of the Japanese B. League, as an Assistant Coach and Director of Player Development.

College statistics

NBA career statistics

Regular season 

(Correct as of 2010–11 season)

|-
| style="text-align:left;"| 
| style="text-align:left;"| Cleveland
| 10 || 0 || 2.0 || .417 || .333 || .000 || .2 || .0 || .1 || .0 || 1.2
|-
| style="text-align:left;"| 
| style="text-align:left;"| Cleveland
| 54 || 6 || 13.7 || .393 || .323 || .711 || 1.5 || .6 || .2 || .1 || 4.1
|-
| style="text-align:left;"| 
| style="text-align:left;"| Cleveland
| 26 || 1 || 15.0 || .325 || .289 || .750 || 1.8 || .8 || .3 || .1 || 4.0
|-
| style="text-align:left;"| Career
| style="text-align:left;"|
| 90 || 7 || 12.8 || .369 || .313 || .719 || 1.5 || .6 || .2 || .1 || 3.8

Playoffs 

|-
| style="text-align:left;"| 2010
| style="text-align:left;"| Cleveland
| 3 || 0 || 1.3 || .000 || .000 || .000 || .0 || .0 || .0 || .0 || 0
|-
| style="text-align:left;"| Career
| style="text-align:left;"|
| 3 || 0 || 1.3 || .000 || .000 || .000 || .0 || .0 || .0 || .0 || 0

Career statistics

Domestic Leagues

Regular season

|-
| 2007-08
| style="text-align:left;"| Hokkaido
| align=center | JBL
| 35 || 38.8 || .434 || .293 || .799 || 7.1 || 1.9 || 0.6 || 0.5 || 24.7
|-
| 2016–17
| style="text-align:left;"| A.E.K.
| align=center | GBL
| 25 || 22.4 || .455 || .442 || .909 || 3.0 || 0.9 || 0.8 || 0.4 || 8.9
|-
| 2017–18
| style="text-align:left;"| A Tokyo
| align=center | B.League
| 59 || 19.8 || .436 || .369 || .816 || 3.5 || 1.1 || 0.5 || 0.3 || 9.0
|}

References

External links 
EuroCup Profile
Eurobasket.com Profile
Spanish League Profile
Greek League Profile 
Greek League Profile 
TBLStat.net Profile
French LNB Profile 
North Carolina Tar Heels bio

1983 births
Living people
20th-century African-American people
21st-century African-American sportspeople
AEK B.C. players
African-American basketball players
Alvark Tokyo players
American expatriate basketball people in France
American expatriate basketball people in Greece
American expatriate basketball people in Israel
American expatriate basketball people in Italy
American expatriate basketball people in Japan
American expatriate basketball people in Spain
American expatriate basketball people in Turkey
American men's basketball players
Anaheim Arsenal players
Baloncesto Fuenlabrada players
Basketball players from Cleveland
Cleveland Cavaliers players
Fayetteville Patriots players
Gaziantep Basketbol players
Hapoel Galil Elyon players
Hapoel Jerusalem B.C. players
Israeli Basketball Premier League players
Karşıyaka basketball players
Koshigaya Alphas players
Levanga Hokkaido players
Liga ACB players
McDonald's High School All-Americans
Metropolitans 92 players
North Carolina Tar Heels men's basketball players
Parade High School All-Americans (boys' basketball)
Power forwards (basketball)
Rio Grande Valley Vipers players
Small forwards
Sportspeople from Greater Cleveland
St. Edward High School (Lakewood, Ohio) alumni
Undrafted National Basketball Association players
Utsunomiya Brex players